Tropical Storm Larry was the twelfth named tropical storm in the 2003 Atlantic hurricane season. It was one of eight storms to impact Mexico from either the Pacific or Atlantic oceans in the season. Due to weak steering currents, the storm moved southward, which resulted in the storm making landfall on the Tabasco coastline. It was the first tropical storm to strike the region since Tropical Storm Brenda in 1973.

The rainfall led to flooding and mudslides, causing damage to thousands of houses. The flooding killed five people and resulted in $53.6 million (2003 USD) in damage. Larry was one of three tropical cyclones to hit Mexico in a short period of time, including Tropical Depression Nora and Tropical Storm Olaf in the eastern Pacific Ocean.

Meteorological history

A tropical wave moved off the coast of Africa on September 17. It moved across the shear-ridden Atlantic Ocean without development, and remained disorganized until reaching the western Caribbean Sea on September 26. There, the wave situated itself beneath an upper-level anticyclone, allowing for favorable upper-level outflow and for deep convection to develop. On the September 27, a low pressure area developed while the system was located a few hundred miles to the east of the Yucatán Peninsula. The system continued to organize, and nearly developed into a tropical depression before moving ashore on the Yucatán Peninsula on September 29.

Dry air and land weakened the tropical wave, and when it entered the area of the Bay of Campeche, it merged with a stationary frontal boundary. Cool, dry air around the system caused the system to develop a cold core, and the area organized into an extratropical low on September 30. A large high pressure system over the northern Gulf of Mexico forced the system southward, where it developed significant convection.

A mid-level ridge forced the storm more to the south-southeast, where after remaining a  storm for three days, Larry made landfall at Paraíso, Tabasco, on October 5. It steadily weakened over land, and degenerated into a remnant low on October 6 while midway through the Isthmus of Tehuantepec. The remnant low turned to the southwest, and reached the eastern Pacific Ocean on the October 7. The remnants of Larry re-organized somewhat in the eastern Pacific, with the National Hurricane Center indicating for the possibility of redevelopment into a tropical depression on October 9. However, the convection diminished, and further development was no longer anticipated.

Preparations

Due to its erratic motion, the Mexican government issued a Tropical Storm Warning and a Hurricane Watch early in Larry's lifetime from Veracruz to Campeche. The watches and warnings were extended westward to Tuxpan on the 4th and extended eastward to Ciudad del Carmen on October 5. Due to the threat of the storm, officials closed three Pemex oil ports. The company used its reserves to make sure profits weren't disrupted. The Mexican government placed six coastal states on maximum alert, while authorities set up 75 evacuation shelters for around 1,500 people. Because of the storm, the government declared much of eastern Mexico a state of emergency.

Impact

Tropical Storm Larry was one of eight storms to hit Mexico from either the Atlantic Ocean or the Pacific Ocean, the highest since the record of nine in 1971.

The flooding damaged more than 21,000 houses across Mexico, in combination with the damage from Eastern Pacific Hurricanes Nora and Olaf. Damage was greatest around the Chiapas capital of Tuxtla Gutiérrez, where over 9,000 houses were affected. The rainfall caused mudslides across the country, hospitalizing two individuals in central Hidalgo. The flooding also caused severe crop damage along Larry's path. Strong wind gusts caused outages to telephone and power services. In all, Larry caused five deaths and $53.6 million in damage (2003 USD, $59 million 2005 USD).

In El Salvador, rainfall from the remnants of Larry—combined with previous rainfall—caused mudslides and flooding, forcing several thousand people to evacuate in San Salvador. The flooding destroyed or damaged hundreds of houses.

Aftermath
Tropical Storm Larry hit Mexico at around the same time as two other tropical storms. The Mexican Red Cross provided aid for 6,587 families throughout the country, while the International Federation of Red Cross and Red Crescent Societies launched an international appeal for aid. The appeal raised $284,472.8 (2003 USD). The Mexican Red Cross distributed 4,000 food and hygiene packets to various places, and delivered 2,750 family packets and over 4,300 mattresses to citizens in Chiapas, as well as 5,000 school kits. A total of 38,750 people benefited from the operation.

See also 

 Other tropical cyclones of the same name
 2003 Atlantic hurricane season
 Timeline of the 2003 Atlantic hurricane season
 2003 Pacific hurricane season

References

Larry
Larry (2003)
Larry (2003)
2003 in Mexico
Larry